Jón Stefánsson may refer to:

 Jón Stefánsson (artist) (1881–1962), Icelandic modern landscape artist
 Jón Arnór Stefánsson (born 1982), Icelandic basketball player
 Jón Kalman Stefánsson (born 1963), Icelandic author
 Þorgils gjallandi (Jón Stefánsson, 1851–1915), Icelandic author
 Jón Stefánsson (academic) (1862–1952), contributor to the Viking Society and author